Aveh (also Romanized as Āveh) is a village in Howmeh Rural District, in the Central District of Larestan County, Fars Province, Iran. At the 2006 census, its population was 215, in 39 families.

References 

Populated places in Larestan County